Andrew Morrison (born 6 September 1994) is a New Zealand cricketer. He made his List A debut on 21 February 2021, for Auckland in the 2020–21 Ford Trophy. Prior to his List A debut, Morrison was part of the New Zealand XI squad that played against the West Indies in December 2017.

References

External links
 

1994 births
Living people
New Zealand cricketers
Auckland cricketers
Place of birth missing (living people)